The Shanghai Conservatory of Music was founded on November 27, 1927, as the first music institution of higher education in China. Its teachers and students have won awards at home and abroad, thus earning the conservatory the name "the cradle of musicians." It is a Chinese state Double First Class University.

As of 2021, Shanghai Conservatory of Music ranked no.4 nationwide among universities specialized in Arts in the recognized Best Chinese Universities Ranking and ranked the best in China in the "Music and Dance" subject .

History

The Shanghai Conservatory of Music is a music institute famous at home and abroad. It grew out of the National Conservatory of Music, which was established by Cai Yuanpei on November 27, 1927. Dr. Xiao Youmei (Shio Yiu-mei) was the director of the new school and curriculum. His teachings were based on the Leipzig Conservatory of Music, where he graduated. It was one of the first institutions of higher learning of modern music in China. It was considered the premiere institution for Western music learning. Professors came from as far as Russia and France. Several of the original professors were recruited from Russian emigres who had fled the Russian civil war (1918-1922) to China.

It was renamed several times: National Training School of Music (1929), Branch of National Conservatory of Music (1943), Shanghai National Training School of Music (1945), Shanghai and Huadong Branches of Chinese Conservatory of Music (early 1950s). It received its current name in 1956.

Programs

The Shanghai Conservatory of Music consists of 13 departments. It involves six disciplines and 23 sub-disciplines, some traditional, the others newly developed.

The conservatory supports a high-level music research institute, a specialized music library with a large collection, a first-class museum of Asian instruments, and a unique music publishing house.

A six-year secondary school and a three-year elementary section were established in 1953 and 1956 to prepare better candidates for tertiary education, thus forming a self-contained system with a complete curriculum of music and academic education.

Three art centers integrate teaching, performing and scientific research: Zhou Xiaoyan International Opera Center, International String Academy, and International Piano Art Center. The conservatory has established six performing groups: Symphony Orchestra of Shanghai Conservatory of Music, New Ensemble, String Quartet, Percussion Ensemble, National Music Orchestra and Choir.

Shanghai Conservatory of Music maintains close relationships with many first-class conservatories and famous musicians, including collaborations with schools in the US, France, UK, Russia, Netherlands, Australia, Austria, Germany and Japan. Many internationally well-known musicians such as Isaac Stern, Itzhak Perlman, Yuri Shishkin, Leon Fleisher, Pinchas Zukerman, Seiji Ozawa, Simon Rattle, Mstislav Rostropovich, and Yo-Yo Ma have served as honorary or guest professors.

Departments
 Arts administration
 Composition
 Conducting
 General Education
 Modern Instruments and Percussion
 Musical
 Music Education
 Music Engineering
 Musicology
 Orchestral Instruments
 Piano
 Traditional Instruments
 Vocal Music and Opera
 Secondary Professional Music School Affiliated to Shanghai Conservatory of Music

Faculty and student body
The conservatory has 50 professors and 120 associate professors. There are approximately 1,200 students.

Notable faculty and alumni

Faculty
 Wen Kezheng (1929–2007), former Director of the Vocal Music and Opera Department
 Liao Changyong, Vice President of the Shanghai Conservatory of Music and Director of the Vocal Music and Opera Department (also alumnus)
 Zhu Jian'er (1922-2017), Chinese symphonic composer and songwriter
 Vladimir Shushlin (1896-1978), Russian vocal teacher 
 He Luting (1903-1999), alumnus and former conservatory director. The main music hall on campus was later named after him.

Alumni

 Lü Ji - composer of revolutionary music
 Ding Shande - composer
 Wang Jianzhong - composer and pianist
 Min Huifen - erhu musician
 Muhai Tang - conductor
 He Xuntian - composer, professor at the Shanghai Conservatory of Music
 Rui Shi Zhuo - composer
 Jampa Tsering - singer and dancer
 Yang Erche Namu - writer and singer
 Jian Wang - cellist
 Liu Fang - pipa musician
 Jiaxin Cheng - cellist
 Du Yun - composer, performer, performance artist
 Yu Di - singer
 Cai Chengyu - opera singer
 Yu-Peng Chen - composer and music producer
 Zhou Yi - pipa musician

References

 Shen, Sinyan. Chinese Music in the 20th Century (Chinese Music Monograph Series). 2001. Chinese Music Society of North America Press. .

External links
 Shanghai Conservatory of Music website (in Chinese)
 Shanghai Conservatory of Music website (in English)
 Shanghai Conservatory of Music Website(English) 
 Shanghai Conservatory of Music Website  

 
Universities and colleges in Shanghai
Music schools in China
Culture in Shanghai
1927 establishments in China